Krogmann Point is the point forming the western extremity of Hovgaard Island, in the Wilhelm Archipelago, Antarctica. Hovgaard Island was first seen by a German expedition under Eduard Dallmann in January 1874 and named "Krogmann Insel". However, the name Hovgaard, applied by the Belgian Antarctic Expedition under Gerlache in February 1898, has overtaken the original in usage. In order to preserve Dallmann's earlier name in this vicinity, the name Krogmann has been applied to the point.

References

Headlands of the Wilhelm Archipelago